Nancy Farmer (born September 11, 1956) was the 43rd State Treasurer of Missouri, serving from 2001 to 2005.

Farmer was raised in Jacksonville, Illinois and graduated from Illinois College there in 1979. From 1993-97, she served in the Missouri House of Representatives. During her tenure in the state legislature, she served as chairwoman of the powerful Ways and Means Committee.

Farmer served as Assistant Treasurer under then-State Treasurer Bob Holden since 1997, then was elected State Treasurer of Missouri herself in November 2000. She was the first woman to hold both posts.

She was the unsuccessful Democratic candidate in the 2004 United States Senate election in Missouri, running against incumbent Republican Kit Bond.

References

|-

|-

1956 births
Illinois College alumni
Living people
Democratic Party members of the Missouri House of Representatives
Politicians from St. Louis
Politicians from Jacksonville, Illinois
State treasurers of Missouri
Women state legislators in Missouri
21st-century American women